Princess Lalla Amina (8 April 1954 – 16 August 2012) was a member of the Moroccan royal family and former President of the Royal Moroccan Federation of Equestrian Sports.

Early life and education
Lalla Amina was born in Antsirabe, Madagascar on 8 April 1954. She was the youngest sister of the King Hassan II of Morocco, and daughter of King Mohammed V of Morocco and his third wife, Lalla Bahia bint Antar. She was born while the royal family was in exile. Mina (as she was nicknamed) was the only child of King Mohammed V of Morocco to have French papers. Upon the royal family's return to Morocco, Malika Oufkir, daughter of a favored general, was informally adopted into the Royal family to be a companion to the princess. Lalla Amina lived in a separate villa to be raised more normally and away from court intrigue and jealousy. Her villa included a private movie theater, a zoo, and her own primary school. She attended Royal College and the University of Rabat.

Marriage
In 1974, Lalla Amina was married to the doctor Sharif Moulay Idris Al Wazani and had one daughter, Sharifa Lalla Sumaya Al Wazani. Her husband died early on allowing Lalla Amina to pursue true "reason for living"– horses.

Activities and awards
Throughout her life she was an avid hunter and equestrian. Lalla Amina was President of the Moroccan Royal Federation of Equestrian Sports from 1999 up until her death in 2012. In 1980, she set up a private breeding stable in Sidi Brini and launched the famous Week of the Horse held in Rabat.
She was also Chairwoman of Special Olympics Morocco and member of Special Olympics Board of Directors. She was awarded the Order of Muhammad Second Class in 2007.

Death and funeral
Laila Amina died after a four month battle with lung cancer in Rabat on 16 August 2012. Her funeral prayers were performed after Al Asr prayer at the Ahl Fez mosque on 17 August 2012. Her body was buried at the Moulay El Hassan Mausoleum at the Royal Palace in Rabat.

Honours

National honours
 Dame Grand Cordon of the Order of the Throne.
 Grand Officer of the Order of Muhammad (2007).

References

20th-century Moroccan people
21st-century Moroccan people
1954 births
2012 deaths
Daughters of kings
Mohammed V University alumni
Moroccan exiles in Madagascar
Moroccan female equestrians
Moroccan princesses

People from Antananarivo
People from Rabat